William Hargraft (October 16, 1829 – July 8, 1887) was an Ontario merchant and political figure. He represented Northumberland West in the Legislative Assembly of Ontario from 1875 to 1879 as a Liberal member.

He was born in Templemore, County Tipperary, Ireland in 1829, the son of the local postmaster, George Hargraft. He came to Cobourg, Upper Canada with his family in 1833. In 1853, he married Mary Ross. Hargraft served on the town council for Cobourg, also serving as mayor and a commissioner of the Cobourg Town Trust. He was a director of the Hand-in-Hand Fire Insurance Company.

His son John later served as a member of the House of Commons.

External links 
The Canadian parliamentary companion and annual register, 1877, CH Mackintosh

1829 births
1887 deaths
Irish emigrants to Canada
Mayors of Cobourg
Ontario Liberal Party MPPs
Politicians from County Tipperary